Muhammadiyah University Press (MUP) is a publisher in Universitas Muhammadiyah Surakarta, Indonesia. Muhammadiyah University Press publishes scientific books and journals.

Publications
MUP publishes 35 scholarly journals  and more than 100 new books each year.

References

Publishing companies of Indonesia